John Brown's last speech, so called by his first biographer, James Redpath, was delivered on November 2, 1859. John Brown was being sentenced in a courtroom packed with whites in Charles Town, Virginia, after his conviction for murder, treason against the Commonwealth of Virginia, and inciting a slave insurrection. According to Ralph Waldo Emerson, the speech's only equal in American oratory is the Gettysburg Address.

As was his custom, Brown spoke extemporaneously, without notes, although he had evidently thought about what he would say; he knew the opportunity was coming. Transcribed by a phonographer (reporter-stenographer) such as newspapers used for important speeches, it was on the front page of countless newspapers nationwide, including the New York Times, the next day.

The American Anti-Slavery Society then predicted that his execution would begin his martyrdom, or that potential clemency would remove "so much capital [...] out of the abolition sails".

Content
Virginia court procedure required that defendants found guilty should be asked if there was any reason sentence should not be imposed. Asked this by the clerk, Brown immediately rose, and in a clear, distinct voice said this:

Courtroom reaction
While Brown was speaking, there was "perfect quiet" in the courtroom. Under Virginia law, one month must elapse between a death sentence and its execution, so the judge, Richard Parker, then sentenced Brown to be hanged one month later, on December 2, and specified that, for the sake of example, the execution would be made more public than usual.

The courtroom continued silence after the reading of the death sentence. "One indecent fellow, behind the Judge's chair, shouted and clapped hands jubilantly; but he was indignantly checked, and in a manner that induced him to believe that he would do best to retire." "This undecorum was promptly suppressed and much regret was expressed by citizens at its occurrence."

Publication of the speech

There were multiple reporters covering Brown's trial. Thanks to the recently invented telegraph, they sent out immediate copy. Brown's speech was distributed by the Associated Press and was the next day, November 3, on the front page of the New York Times, the Richmond Dispatch, the Detroit Free Press, the Milwaukee Daily Sentinel, and other newspapers. Over the next few days, the full text appeared in approximately 50 other papers across the country. Wm. Lloyd Garrison printed it broadside as a poster and sold it in The Liberator's office in Boston. The American Anti-Slavery Society published it in a pamphlet, with extracts from Brown's letters. A verse on the title page, "He, being dead, yet speaketh", compares Brown with Abel, killed by Cain.

Immediate reactions

Supporting Brown
In the evening of December 1, as many of the papers reported together with Brown's speech, the abolitionist Wendell Phillips gave a speech in Brooklyn, in Henry Ward Beecher's Plymouth Church, an important abolitionist center and Underground Railroad station. Though the talk had been scheduled in advance, on "The Lesson of the Hour", the topic of John Brown had not been announced, and was a surprise to those present. According to Phillips, in the lead story on page 1 of the New York Herald:

Frederick Douglass, having escaped to Canada from a Virginia warrant, also referred to "the thing calling itself the Government of Virginia, but which in fact is but an organized conspiracy by one party of the people against the other and weaker".

On November 1, in Boston, the executive committee of the American Anti-Slavery Society resolved to observe "that tragical event" of Brown's forthcoming execution. The yet undefined action of observation would be "the first step towards making Brown a Martyr, but should Governor Wise see fit to reprieve him, so much capital will be taken out of the abolition sails".

Hostile to Brown

Andrew Hunter, the Prosecuting Attorney
The Prosecuting Attorney, Andrew Hunter, published 30 years later his recollections of the speech:

Rev. Samuel Leech
In his firsthand account written and published 50 years later, Leech stated the following.
"Brown's statement was not exactly sustained by the facts. Why had he collected the Sharpe's rifles, the pikes, the kegs of powder, many thousands of caps and much war-like material at the Kennedy farm? Why did he and other armed men break into the United States Armory and Arsenal, make portholes in the engine house, shoot and kill citizens, and surround their own imprisoned persons with prominent men as hostages? But everybody in the court house believed the old man when he said that he did everything with a solitary motive, the liberation of the slaves."

Modern commentary
Brown's speech contains what two modern writers have called "lies"; Alfred Kazin called it Brown's "great, lying speech". It is not correct that he helped slaves escape from Missouri "without the snapping of a gun on either side". One man, David Cruise, was killed. And his statement that he was not trying to start a slave insurrection does not jibe with many other comments he made before the raid. Yet according to Brown's biographer David S. Reynolds, "the Gettysburg Address similarly glossed over disturbing details in the interest of making a higher point. Lincoln left out the bloody horrors of the Civil War, just as Brown minimized his bloody tactics."

Also according to Reynolds, with this speech, both North and South stopped seeing Brown as only an irritating extremist. It was clear that he was a Christian and an American. The South scrambled to denounce him as simply a villain. The North began to regard him as a hero. The need to abolish slavery immediately was no longer a fringe position in the North.

 
The cross † indicates that the speech appears on page 1.
The asterisk * indicates that speech is accompanied by discussion or other related news.

Free states
 Connecticut
 East Haddam Journal, November 5
 Illinois
 Chicago Tribune, November 3
 Indiana
 *Belvidere Standard, November 8
 †*Dawson's Fort Wayne Weekly Times, November 5
 *Evansville Daily Evening Inquirer, November 3
 *Evansville Daily Journal, November 3
 *Indiana Daily State Sentinel, November 5
 †*Seymour Times, November 10
 *Sullivan Democrat, November 10
 *Terre Haute Wabash Express, November 9
 Weekly Vincennes Western Sun, November 4
 Iowa
 Muscatine Evening Journal, November 4,
 Kansas
 *Elwood Free Press, November 5
 †*Kansas Herald of Freedom, November 12
 Massachusetts
 Fall River Daily Evening News, November 3
 *The Liberator, November 4
 Michigan
 *Cass County Republican, November 10
 †*Detroit Free Press, November 3
 New York
 *Douglass' Monthly, November
 *Frank Leslie's Illustrated Newspaper, November 12
 †*New York Times, November 3
 *Rensselaer Gazette, November 9
 Ohio
 *Ashtabula Weekly Telegraph, November 5
 *Pomeroy Weekly Telegraph, November 8
 *Summit County Beacon, November 9
 Western Reserve Chronicle, November 9
 Pennsylvania
 Bradford Reporter, November 10
 *Carlisle Weekly Herald, November 8
 *Erie Observer, November 10
 *Lancaster Examiner and Herald, November 9
 *Montrose Independent Republican, November 7
 *National Anti-Slavery Standard, November 6
 *Raftsman's Journal, November 9
 *Towanda Bradford Reporter, November 10
 Rhode Island
 *Bristol Phenix, November 5
 Vermont
 *Aurora of the Valley, November 12
 *Montpelier Green Mountain Freeman, November 10
 *The St. Johnsbury Caledonian, November 12
 *Vermont Journal, November 12
 Wisconsin
 *Grant County Witness, November 10
 *Janesville Daily Gazette, November 4
 *Milwaukee Daily Sentinel, November 3
 *Wausau Daily Wisconsin, November 10
 *Weekly Gazette and Free Press, November 11
 Slave states
 District of Columbia
 *National Era, November 10
 Georgia
 *Athens Southern Banner, November 10
 North Carolina
 Fayetteville Observer, November 7
 *The Greensboro Times, November 12
 Wilmington Daily Herald, November 4
 Virginia
 †*Richmond Dispatch, November 4
 *Shepherdstown Register, November 5
 Wheeling Daily Intelligencer, November 3
 Foreign
 England
 *Illustrated Times'' (London), November 26

See also
 Last words

References

1859 speeches
1859 in Virginia
November 1859 events
John Brown (abolitionist)
Charles Town, West Virginia
Farewell addresses
John Brown's raid on Harpers Ferry
19th-century American trials